Marek Gengel and Adam Pavlásek were the defending champions but lost in the semifinals to Yuki Bhambri and Saketh Myneni.

Bhambri and Myneni won the title after defeating Christopher Rungkat and Akira Santillan 2–6, 7–6(9–7), [14–12] in the final.

Seeds

Draw

References

External links
 Main draw

Nonthaburi Challenger II - Doubles